The San Miguel Master Chorale (SMMC), now non-existent, was the first professional choir in the Philippines. It was composed of an all-Filipino roster ranging from faculty members and honor graduates of music conservatories, alumni of various choirs, choral conductors, composers, arrangers, and soloists.

The SMMC, together with the San Miguel Philharmonic Orchestra, was disbanded in January 2007 by the San Miguel Corporation.

Beginnings
The SMMC was established in 2001 by The San Miguel Foundation for the Performing Arts, an organization owned by the San Miguel Corporation and committed to the enrichment of arts and culture in the Philippines. Since the SMMC is backed by the largest food and beverage company in the Philippines, many singers from other music groups were lured into joining the SMMC. In 2000, close to 400 people underwent a rigorous series of auditions before an international panel of experts, but only the top 40 made it to the final roster.

Performances
In 2002, the SMMC participated in the 4th Taipei International Choral Festival in Taipei, Taiwan, and the Jeonju Sound Festival in Jeonju, South Korea.

In 2004, the SMMC performed an all-Filipino repertoire in "Kayumanggi" and "Klasik Kayumanggi" at the Cultural Center of the Philippines.

In 2005 the SMMC was asked to perform at Kyoto, Japan in the prestigious 7th World Symposium on Choral Music. Brian Newhouse, an American music critic who watched the performances in Kyoto, has this to say about the SMMC:

Also, the SMMC regularly performs with the SMPO in selected malls across Metro Manila.

What the top guns of the SMFPA have to say about the SMMC:

Disbandment
The executives of the SMC had already disbanded the SMMC and the SMPO. Late January 2007, instrumentalists of the SMPO and SMMC were summoned one by one by the executives who informed them of the non-renewal of their contracts. Many of the musicians did not get any separation pay. Insider reports say that the SMC was "more inclined" to support its four professional basketball teams. No word yet on what happened to Ryan Cayabyab, the SMFPA Executive and artistic director.

Discography

Great Original Pilipino Music by Ryan Cayabyab
All songs in the album composed and arranged by Ryan Cayabyab. All songs recorded in 2001, except tracks 5, 8, and 9, which are SMMC a capella tracks and were recorded in 2004. This album received three nominations in the 18th Awit Awards aside from winning Best Musical Arrangement for Tuwing Umuulan at Kapiling Ka.
 Tuwing Umuulan at Kapiling Ka (winner, 18th Awit Awards, Best Musical Arrangement)
 Iduyan Mo
 Kahit Ika'y Panaginip Lang
 Paraisong Parisukat
 Tunay na Ligaya
 Nais Ko
 Limandipang Tao
 Tsismis
 Da Coconut Nut
 Iniibig Kita
 Paraiso
 Awit ng Pagsinta (Epithalamium) – from Ryan Cayabyab and Bienvenido Lumbera's pop-ballet Rama Hari; lyrics by Lumbera
 Hibang sa Awit – lyrics by Jose Javier Reyes

PASKO I
Festive Filipino Christmas classics, all songs arranged & conducted by Ryan Cayabyab and performed by the SMPO and the SMMC. Certified Gold Record.
 Kampana ng Simbahan
 Heto na Naman – music and lyrics by Ryan Cayabyab
 Namamasko
 Tuloy na Tuloy pa rin ang Pasko
 Sa Paskong Darating
 Maligayang Pasko at Manigong Bagong Taon (Ang Pasko ay Sumapit)
 Kumukutikutitap*
 Mano Po Ninong, Mano Po Ninang
 Noche Buena
 Heto na Naman ang Pasko**
 Maligayang Pasko**
 Pasko na Naman
 from Ryan Cayabyab and Jose Javier Reyes's musical Bituin; lyrics by Reyes
 from Ryan Cayabyab and Jose Javier Reyes's musical teleplay Pasko sa Amin; lyrics by Reyes

PASKO II
Mellow Filipino Christmas classics, all songs arranged & conducted by Ryan Cayabyab and performed by the SMPO and the SMMC. Certified Gold Record. Isang Taong Lumipas won as Best Christmas Song during the 19th Awit Awards.
 Ngayong Pasko*
 Pasko Na Sinta Ko
 Paskong Walang Hanggan*
 Himig Pasko
 Miss Kita Kung Christmas
 Isang Taong Lumipas*
 Ang Aking Pamasko
 Ang Mahalin Ka**
 Anong Gagawin Mo Ngayong Pasko – music and lyrics by Ryan Cayabyab
 Ang Naaalala Ko**
 Munting Sanggol – music and lyrics by Ryan Cayabyab
 Payapang Daigdig

 Music by Ryan Cayabyab, lyrics by Jose Javier Reyes
 From Ryan Cayabyab and Jose Javier Reyes's musical teleplay Pasko sa Amin; lyrics by Reyes

Spoliarium: The Opera
A neo-opera in three acts based on the life of renowned Filipino painter Juan Luna. Music by Ryan Cayabyab, libretto by Fides Cuyugan-Asensio.

The Sacred Works Of Ryan Cayabyab
Religious compositions of Cayabyab. Misa was his thesis composition for his graduation at the University of the Philippines College of Music. Misa 2000 was composed for and won as Original Music Composition for Dance in the 2000 Onassis International Cultural Competition in Greece. This album won as Best Religious Album in the 2004 Catholic Mass Media Awards.

Disc 1
 Misa 2000
 Kyrie
 Gloria
 Credo
 Sanctus
 Agnus Dei
 Te Deum

Disc 2
 Misa
 Kyrie
 Gloria
 Credo
 Sanctus
 Agnus Dei
 Aquesta Me Guiaba
 Aba Po, Santa Mariang Reyna
 Anima Christi

Beauty and the Beast
Songs from the Philippine run of the musical Beauty and the Beast, arranged and conducted by Ryan Cayabyab, performed by the musical's main cast with the SMPO and the SMMC.
 Home (KC Concepcion)
 Beauty and the Beast (show version by Pinky Marquez)
 A Change in Me (KC Concepcion)
 If I Can't Love Her (Jett Pangan)
 Beauty and the Beast (pop version by Luke Mijares)

Great Original Filipino Music from the Movies
Well-known and well-loved theme songs from Filipino movies from 1977 to 2002. Recorded live in July 2006 and released December of that year. Mainly featuring the SMMC, accompanied by the SMPO. Choral arrangements by Ryan Cayabyab, Jesus Carlo Merino, Ed Nepomuceno and Nathanael Arnel de Pano (the latter 2 being section leaders of the SMMC Tenors and Basses, respectively), and Eudenice Palaruan (SMMC Principal Conductor). All orchestrations by Ryan Cayabyab.
 Sana'y Wala Nang Wakas
 Kahit Isang Saglit
 Pangako
 Pangarap Na Bituin
 Pagdating Ng Panahon
 Kailangan Kita
 Hanggang Sa Dulo Ng Walang Hanggan
 Kailangan Ko'y Ikaw
 Iduyan Mo – music and lyrics by Ryan Cayabyab, from the movie "Agila" (1980)
 Hanggang Ngayon
 Tanging Yaman
 Sinasamba Kita
 Ikaw Lang Ang Mamahalin
 Gaano Kadalas Ang Minsan
 Paraisong Parisukat – music and lyrics by Ryan Cayabyab, from the movie "Masikip, Maluwang...Paraisong Parisukat" (1977)

Dancing In The Rain
An album featuring Ryan Cayabyab's talent as a pianist in his own right, accompanied by the SMPO & SMMC. Recorded live in August 2006 and released December of that year. Entire tracklist composed, arranged, and produced by Ryan Cayabyab.
 First Glance
 Feels Like This Love Affair Is Gonna Last Forever
 Frap For Two On A Beach In Cebu
 Photographs Of You And Me, Together
 Like Children Dancing In The Rain With Nothing On
 Alone, Drenched In The Red, Orange and Gold Of A Manila Sunset
 Grey Clouds! Grey Clouds! Its Beginning To Drizzle
 Its Getting More Difficult To Explain Why I Do Things The Way That I Do
 Almost Sunup And I Haven't Slept
 Last Drip To Boracay
 This Is Beginning To Sound Like An Old Song
 It Isn't The First Time Someone Left Me
 Letting Go
 Last Look

Future Albums
Other music albums are said to be in the pipeline, such as:
 A compilation of popular folk songs representative of different regions in the Philippines; e.g., "Atin Cu Pung Singsing," "Usahay, "Ay, Kalisud," and "Sarungbanggi."
 A compilation of popular novelty songs including "Ocho-ocho," "Pito-pito," and possibly "Boom Tarat-Tarat," all to be performed in symphonic style.

References

External links
The SMFPA Official Website as archived from Wayback Machine

Filipino choirs
Musical groups established in 2001
Musical groups disestablished in 2007
San Miguel Corporation people
2001 establishments in the Philippines
2007 disestablishments in the Philippines